India Scarlett Willoughby (born 2 September 1965) is an English newsreader, broadcaster, journalist and reality television personality. She is Britain's first transgender national television newsreader and the first transgender co-host of an all-women talk show, Loose Women on ITV. She is a previous nominee for a British LGBT Award (2017) and winner of the Diversity in Media Award (2017) for Media Moment of the Year (Loose Women).

Early life
Willoughby was born and grew up in Carlisle, Cumbria.

Career
Willoughby presented the news in the North East and Cumbria as a TV reporter at ITV Border prior to her transition.

In 2016, she re-joined ITV Border as an on-screen reporter, before moving on a three-month contract to ITV Tyne Tees. 

In 2017, she joined 5News on Channel 5 – becoming Britain's first transgender national television newsreader, reading the lunchtime and evening updates.

The same year Willoughby was invited onto ITV's Loose Women to tell her story as a guest – but due to the public's response, she was invited back to be a co-host, in a show featuring Priscilla Presley and Russell Watson.

In January 2018, Willoughby took part in Channel 5's Celebrity Big Brother – Year of the Woman.

After Celebrity Big Brother, Willoughby became the victim of social media trolling about her looks. She described herself as "The most hated transgender person in Britain." As a result, she had facial feminisation surgery in Marbella in 2018.

Willoughby has since been a regular guest on ITV's Good Morning Britain. She has also appeared on programmes including Channel 5's Most Shocking Celebrity Moments 2018 and When News Goes Horribly Wrong 2018.

Willoughby left GB News in June 2021 after accusing the broadcaster of demonising transgender people.

BBC Woman's Hour 
In 2017, Willoughby was interviewed on BBC Woman's Hour by long-time host Jenni Murray. Murray asked Willoughby if she considered herself to be a real woman, to which Willoughby replied "Yes". Murray then asked if it was difficult appearing on an all-women show (Loose Women) to talk about women's issues. Willoughby replied, "No, because I've always been a woman." 

Murray then asked Willoughby to comment on a story about London's Dorchester Hotel imposing a new dress code on male and female staff telling them not to display body hair on duty. Willoughby said she supported the rule – because, in a five-star hotel, she felt staff should be groomed and that customers "didn't want to be served soup by someone grubby with hairy legs, because it's not hygienic." Murray later wrote an article in The Times about the interview, stating that transgender women were not real women.

Celebrity Big Brother 
Willoughby was a housemate in the 21st UK season of Celebrity Big Brother – subtitled Year of the Woman, to mark the 100th anniversary since women got the vote.

Willoughby described drag as being the equivalent of blackface, sparking strong criticism on social media. A photo later emerged on social media of Willoughby posing with drag queens at Harrogate Pride – though Willoughby said this was a paid engagement, at which she had been asked to have her photograph taken with "colourful characters."

Willoughby was the first person evicted, on the 11th day.

Online abuse and death threats
In a December 2022 interview with MyLondon, Willoughby revealed feeling suicidal over the hate she received on social media, which she felt worsened after Elon Musk's acquisition of Twitter. She called it a "double-edged sword"; while she enjoyed her online community, she said there was "no protection" from threats. She took a break from the website as advised by the police.

On 20 February 2023, Willoughby reported that she had received a "graphic" death threat in a "hand-delivered" letter from the proscribed neo-Nazi terrorist group National Action, the same day anti-racist commentator Shola Mos-Shogbamimu reported receiving a similarly threatening letter from the same group. The following day, it was announced the Metropolitan Police's counter-terrorism command had launched an investigation into the threats.

References 

Living people
Year of birth missing (living people)
1960s births
Transgender women
English journalists
LGBT media personalities
People from London
People from Carlisle, Cumbria
ITN newsreaders and journalists